John Joseph "Jack" Sheehan (born August 23, 1940) is a retired United States Marine Corps general.  His final active duty commands, culminating 35 years of service in the Marine Corps, were as the Supreme Allied Commander Atlantic (SACLANT) for NATO and as Commander-in-Chief for the U.S. Atlantic Command (CINCUSACOM) (1994–1997).

Life and career
Sheehan was born on August 23, 1940, in Somerville, Massachusetts. The son of Irish immigrants, he is one of seven children. He graduated with a B.A. degree in English from Boston College in June 1962. After graduation, he was commissioned a second lieutenant in the U.S. Marine Corps. As a captain, Sheehan was awarded the Silver Star Medal for gallantry during combat operations from September 14 to 17, 1968. He holds an M.S. degree from Georgetown University in Government. His professional military education includes the Amphibious Warfare School, Naval Command and Staff College, and National War College.

He served in various command positions ranging from company commander to brigade commander in both the Atlantic and Pacific theater of operations. Sheehan assumed command of 8th Marine Regiment from 14 November 1986 to 16 May 1988.
Sheehan's served a combat tour in Desert Shield/Desert Storm. 
His staff positions included duties as regimental, division, and service headquarters staff officer as well as joint duty with the United States Army, the Office of the Secretary of Defense, and the U.S. Atlantic Command.

Before assuming his final duties as Supreme Allied Commander, Atlantic and Commander in Chief, U.S. Atlantic Command on October 31, 1994, General Sheehan served as Director for Operations, J-3, Joint Staff, Washington, D.C.  General Sheehan retired from the Marine Corps on September 24, 1997.

In 1998, Sheehan joined Bechtel International as a senior vice president.  While remaining with Bechtel, Sheehan joined the Military Officers Association of America board of directors in 2012.  He became chairman of the board in 2016.

Controversy
In March 2010 he testified to the US Congress that according to the chief of staff of the Dutch Army at the time of the incident, the fall of Srebrenica was caused by lack of readiness related to the Dutch being more concerned with internal 'socialisation' of the military than fighting capacity. Sheehan stated it was in part due to homosexual men serving in the military. During the same testimony, Sheehan stated that gays weakened the army, while attraction between men and women in gender-integrated units would not. Speculation has it that Sheehan meant General Henk van den Breemen, Dutch chief of staff at the time of the Srebrenica genocide. General van den Breemen denied having said such a thing and called Sheehan's comments "total nonsense". Dutch Minister of Defense Eimert van Middelkoop stated that Sheehan's  statement was "disgraceful," "unworthy of anyone in the military".  Prime-Minister Jan Peter Balkenende of the Netherlands stated that Sheehan's words are "shameful", "outrageous", "beneath contempt" and "disrespectful towards all troops involved". Dutch advocates of gay rights, organized in the Pink Army (foundation) and the Stichting Homosexualiteit en Krijgsmacht ("Foundation Homosexuality and Armed Forces"), announced a libel lawsuit against Sheehan, demanded public apologies, and for Sheehan to follow sensitivity training. The majority of the Dutch parliament voiced their support for the class action.

On March 29, 2010, Dutch media reported that Sheehan had sent an e-mail to his Dutch colleague General Henk van den Breemen in which he apologized for his comments. He stated that his memory of the conversation was inaccurate.

Awards and decorations
His decorations and medals include:

See also
 Sexual orientation and the military of the Netherlands
 Sexual orientation and gender identity in military service

References

External links

1940 births
Living people
Morrissey College of Arts & Sciences alumni
People from Somerville, Massachusetts
United States Marine Corps generals
Georgetown University alumni
Recipients of the Silver Star
Recipients of the Gallantry Cross (Vietnam)
Recipients of the Defense Superior Service Medal
Recipients of the Defense Distinguished Service Medal
Military personnel from Massachusetts